Jabugo is a town and municipality located in the province of Huelva, Spain. According to the 2005 census, it has a population of 2,475 inhabitants.  The region is known for its signature ham, Jamón ibérico.

References

External links
Jabugo - Sistema de Información Multiterritorial de Andalucía.  (In Spanish)

Municipalities in the Province of Huelva